C80 may refer to :
 HMS Mauritius (C80), a 1938 British Royal Navy cruiser
 Final Articles Revision Convention, 1946 code
 New Coalinga Municipal Airport FAA LID
 Ruy Lopez chess openings ECO code
 Malignant neoplasm without specification of site ICD-10 code
 Caldwell 80 (Omega Centauri or NGC 5139), a globular cluster in the constellation Centaurus
 C80, carbon-80, a fullerene